Algeo is a surname and occasional given name. Notable people with the name include:

 Bill Algeo (born 1989), American martial artist
 John Algeo (1930–2019), American Theosophist and Freemason
 Sara MacCormack Algeo (1876–1953), American suffragist and educator
 Thomas Algeo Rowley (1808–1892), Union Army general